The Constitution of Jamaica is the [[constitution]collection of laws made by the government.]].

History

As a constituent province of the West Indies Federation, Jamaica became independent of the United Kingdom on 6 August 1962 under the Jamaica Independence Act 1962. Under the West Indies Act 1962, the monarchy of the United Kingdom was allowed to form governments for the former colonies of the West Indies Federation. Elizabeth II, by and with the advice of Her Privy Council, issued the Jamaica Order in Council 1962 which formally gave force and effect to the constitution.

References

External links
 Constitution of 1962 with Reforms through 1999 from the Georgetown University Political Database of the Americas.

Government of Jamaica
Jamaica